Abderrahmane Farès (ALA-LC: ʿAbd ar-Raḥman Fāris; ; January 30, 1911 – May 13, 1991) was the Chairman of the Provisional Executive of Algeria from 13 April 1962 to 20 September 1962.

Biography 
Farès, who was born in Amalou, Béjaïa Province, was a lawyer by profession. After the Second World War, Farès was elected to municipal council and the general council of Algiers. In the 1945 French Constituent Assembly election, Farès was the fourth candidate of the Union and Social Progress List for the Muslim non-citizen constituency of Algiers (which had four seats in total). The list won three of the four seats. When the elected Constituent Assembly member Bachir Abdelouahab resigned, Farès overtook his seat in the Assembly on March 14, 1946. He sat in the French Section of the Workers' International (Social-Democrats) parliamentary group.

In the Constituent Assembly he was included in the Interior, Algeria and General Administration Commission.

He then took part to the Algerian Assembly election in 1948 and 1951, and became its President in 1953.

References

1911 births
1991 deaths
People from Amalou, Algeria
People of French Algeria
Kabyle people
Algerian Berber politicians
Union and Social Progress List politicians
National Liberation Front (Algeria) politicians
Presidents of Algeria
Members of the Constituent Assembly of France (1945)